Pranas Talzūnas (born as Frank Konstant Talzunas; May 23, 1913 in Chicago – 1984) was a Lithuanian American basketball player. He won a gold medal with the Lithuania national basketball team during the EuroBasket 1937, held in Riga. Pranas was named MVP of EuroBasket 1937 and is regarded as the first player to use the hook shot. Talzūnas attitude toward the game, the matches and the representing of the nation seriousness are perfectly described by his words after the successful competition ending: "I confess that going to Riga I had no clue what to thought: whenever we will win or not. I didn't knew how our upcoming opponents plays. <...> We won deservedly, however <...> it wasn't easy. <...> The concern of the upcoming battles for me and for Feliksas Kriaučiūnas didn't let us to sleep for any single night. <...> We were considering the victories possibilities for hours and still doubted it. Now everything is over. For me the heaviest stone just fall from the chest".

Player profile

Pranas Talzūnas game-play was perfectly described by the sport journalist Juozas Kusa: "Talzūnas doesn't like to shoot from far, he scores all the points from under the basket. <...> It is his specialty and that his ability was overshadowed rarely by defender at least once. Just look – he got the ball, discreetly turned around, the defender is left at the other side, the, most frequently, right hand rises and the basket is done. He is also capable to shoot from far: he shot only once versus Italy and implanted it".

Juris Silarājs, a Latvia national team member in 1939, who vigilantly spectated the second European championship, described him by saying: "P. Talzūnas wasn't very tall, possibly 182–183 centimeters, however he was a tightly structured athlete. <...> The whole Lithuania national team game was based on P. Talzūnas. <...> The attack was started by F. Kriaučiūnas, then the ball was reaching Žukas and he was passing it to the P. Talzūnas, who was finishing the attack. We saw a new way to shoot into the basket: by having the ball, standing at his back to the basket, P. Talzūnas was jumping by turning into the basket and was sending the ball to the basket with his both hands".

Olgert Altberg, the famous Latvian basketball coach, theoretician and professor, described Talzūnas by telling: "P. Talzūnas has shown the shot over the head for the first time – a hook shot. Nobody saw such shooting way before".

From the Latvian press of that time: "Talzūnas, as attacker, was receiving at least half of the points, which the Lithuanian team was scoring. He is irreplaceable in his activity under the basket. The Italy, Poland, Estonia and Egypt defenders were vainly trying to detain this famous Lithuanian player, who was the best attacker".

References

External links
Phil Hersh, Lithuania Stands Tall In Basketball, in «Chicago Tribune», June 21, 1992.

1913 births
Year of death missing
American people of Lithuanian descent
FIBA EuroBasket-winning players
Lithuanian men's basketball players
Basketball players from Chicago